Dokumental GmbH & Co KG Schreibfarben is a German based company and claims to be the world market leader in the development and production of inks and writing fluids. The products are solely produced in Germany (Ludwigshafen und Mittenwald) and sold in more than 100 countries all over the world. Dokumental belongs to the Woellner Group Holding.

The product range includes all kinds of writing fluids, like inks for ball pens, roller balls, gel pens, board markers, permanent markers, highlighters, etc.. Newly developed products are inks certified according to CE and smooth writing inks for ball pens.
Dokumental also offers varied support e.g. for the development of new products, searching for individual solutions or even regulatory questions.

DOKU-Inkjet: Dokumental also offers tailor-made inks for professional Inkjet applications, whereas the focus is on UV-curable inks.

History

References

Companies based in Rhineland-Palatinate
Chemical companies established in 1952
Manufacturing companies of Germany
1952 establishments in West Germany